Sophia Hayden (October 17, 1868 – February 3, 1953) was an American architect and first female graduate of the four-year program in architecture at Massachusetts Institute of Technology.

Life

Early life 

Sophia Gregoria Hayden was born in Santiago, Chile. Her mother, Elezena Fernandez, was from Chile, and her father, George Henry Hayden, was an American dentist from Boston. Hayden had a sister and two brothers. When she was six, she was sent to Jamaica Plain, a neighborhood of Boston, to live with her paternal grandparents, George and Sophia Hayden, and attended the Hillside School. While attending West Roxbury High School (1883–1886) she found an interest in architecture. After graduation Hayden's family moved to Richmond, Virginia, but she returned to Boston for college. She graduated from MIT in 1890 with a degree in architecture, with honours.

Education 

Hayden shared a drafting room with Lois Lilley Howe, a fellow female architect at Massachusetts Institute of Technology (MIT). Hayden's work was influenced by MIT professor Eugène Létang.

After completing her studies Hayden may have had a hard time finding an entry level apprentice position as an architect because she was a woman so she accepted a position as a mechanical drawing teacher at the Eliot School of Fine and Applied Arts in Jamaica Plain.

Career

World's Columbian Exposition 

She is best known for designing The Woman's Building at the World's Columbian Exposition in 1893, when she was just 21. The Woman's Building was the nation's most prominent design competition for women at that time. Hayden based her design on her thesis project, "Renaissance Museum of Fine Arts," a grand two-story structure with center and end pavilions, multiple arches, columned terraces and other classical features, reflecting her Beaux-Art training. It became a controversial structure as many women objected to having their work in a separate structure. 

Hayden's entry won first prize out of a field of thirteen entries submitted by trained female architects. She received $1,000 for the design, when some male architects earned $10,000 for similar buildings.

During construction, Hayden's design principles were compromised by incessant changes demanded by the construction committee, spearheaded by socialite Bertha Palmer, who eventually fired Hayden from the project. Hayden appeared at the Inaugural Celebration and had published accounts of support by her fellow architects.

Her frustration eventually was pointed to as typifying women's unfitness for supervising construction, although many architects sympathized with her position and defended her. In the end the rifts were made up, perhaps, and Hayden's building received an award for "Delicacy of style, artistic taste, and geniality and elegance of the interior."  Within a year or two, virtually all the Fair buildings were destroyed.  Frustrated with the way she had been treated, Hayden may or may not have decided to retire from architecture, but she did not work again as an architect.

Retirement 
In 1900, Hayden married a portrait painter and, later, interior designer, William Blackstone Bennett, in Winthrop, Massachusetts. A stepdaughter, Jennie "Minnie" May Bennett, was from William Blackstone Bennett's prior marriage. The couple had no children. William died of pneumonia on April 11, 1909.

Although Hayden designed a memorial for women's clubs in the U.S. in 1894, it was never built. She worked as an artist for years and lived a quiet life in Winthrop, Massachusetts. Hayden died at the Winthrop Convalescent Nursing Home in 1953 of pneumonia after suffering a stroke.

In popular culture
 Hayden is mentioned in Erik Larson's 2003 novel The Devil in the White City.
 Hayden is played by Katherine Cunningham in the eleventh episode of the first season of the TV series Timeless (2017), although she didn't stay at H.H. Holmes' hotel.

Works or publications 
 "Abstract of Thesis: Sophia G. Hayden, 1890." Technology Architectural Review 3 (September 31, 1890): 28,30.
 "The Woman's Building." In Rand McNally and Company's A Week at the Fair, 180. Chicago: Rand McNally, 1893.

See also 
 Women architects
 Women in architecture

References

Further reading 

 Allaback, Sarah; The First American Women Architects, Urbana: University of Illinois Press, 2008. p. 94-96. .
 Ashby, Ruth, and Deborah G. Ohrn. "Sophia Hayden." Herstory: Women Who Changed the World. New York: Viking, 1995. .
 Darney, Virginia Grant, Women and World's Fairs: American International Expositions, 1876-1904. Ann Arbor, Mich: UMI Dissertation Services, 1982. 
 Gullet, Gayle. "Our Great Opportunity": Organized Women Advance Women's Work at the World's Columbian Exposition of 1893. Illinois Historical Journal (Winter 1994). PDF edition. Illinois State Historical Society. .
 Hayden, William B. In Memoriam: Mrs. Sophia W. Hayden, 1819-1892. Boston: Massachusetts New-Church Union Press, 1893. Print. .
 Larson, Erik; The Devil in the White City: Murder, Magic, and Madness at the Fair That Changed America, Crown Publishers, 2003.  .
 Sicherman, Barbara, and Carol H. Green. “Hayden, Sophia Gregoria.”  In Notable American Women: The Modern Period : a Biographical Dictionary. Cambridge, Mass: Belknap Press of Harvard University Press, 1980. .
 Stern, Madeleine B. "Three American women firsts in architecture: Harriet Irwin, Louise Bethune, Sophia G. Hayden Science & technology : America's first woman telegrapher: Sarah G. Bagley." We the Women: Career Firsts of Nineteenth-Century America. New York: Schulte Pub. Co, 1963. 
 Torre, Susana. "Sophia Hayden and the Woman's Building Competition / Judith Paine,"Women in American Architecture: A Historic and Contemporary Perspective : a Publication and Exhibition Organized by the Architectural League of New York Through Its Archive of Women in Architecture. New York: Whitney Library of Design, 1977. .
 Weimann, Jeanne M. The Fair Women: the Story of the Woman's Building, World's Columbian Exposition, Chicago 1893. Chicago, Ill: Academy Chicago, 1981. .

Online Resource - Photo Source
 Alden, Henry M. Harper's New Monthly Magazine. New York: Harper & Bros, 1850. Internet resource.  Sophia G. Hayden at Hathi Trust.

External links 
 Pioneering Women of American Architecture, Sophia Gregoria Hayden Bennett
 Remembering Sophia Hayden Bennett - detailed biography with references
 https://www.britannica.com/biography/Sophia-Hayden#ref668673

1868 births
1953 deaths
People from Santiago
American women architects
World's Columbian Exposition
MIT School of Architecture and Planning alumni
American people of Chilean descent
Deaths from pneumonia in Massachusetts
Clubwomen
People from Jamaica Plain